Ismael Salim Dunga (born 24 February 1993) is a Kenyan footballer who currently plays as a forward for Sagan Tosu.

Club career
Dunga joined Albanian side Luftëtari in 2018.

Career statistics

Club

Notes

Honours
Tirana
 Albanian Superliga: 2019–20

References

External links

1996 births
Living people
Kenyan footballers
Association football defenders
SoNy Sugar F.C. players
Tusker F.C. players
Mt Kenya United F.C. players
Acharnaikos F.C. players
City of Lusaka F.C. players
NAPSA Stars F.C. players
Luftëtari Gjirokastër players
KF Tirana players
Kenyan Premier League players
Football League (Greece) players
Kategoria e Parë players
Kenyan expatriate footballers
Kenyan expatriate sportspeople in Greece
Kenyan expatriate sportspeople in Morocco
Kenyan expatriate sportspeople in Zambia
Kenyan expatriate sportspeople in Albania
Expatriate footballers in Greece
Expatriate footballers in Morocco
Expatriate footballers in Zambia
Expatriate footballers in Albania